Cosoleto is a comune (municipality) in the Province of Reggio Calabria in the Italian region Calabria, located about  southwest of Catanzaro and about  northeast of Reggio Calabria.

Cosoleto borders the following municipalities: Africo, Delianuova, Oppido Mamertina, Roghudi, Samo, San Luca, San Procopio, Santa Cristina d'Aspromonte, Scido, Sinopoli.

Demographic evolution

References

External links 
 Municipality of Cosoleto

Cities and towns in Calabria